Gang Jeong-ho (born 16 December 1938) is a South Korean wrestler. He competed in the men's freestyle featherweight at the 1960 Summer Olympics.

References

External links
 

1938 births
Living people
South Korean male sport wrestlers
Olympic wrestlers of South Korea
Wrestlers at the 1960 Summer Olympics
Wrestlers at the 1958 Asian Games
Sport wrestlers from Seoul
Asian Games competitors for South Korea
20th-century South Korean people